Anton Lindner (12 April 1917 – 17 February 1994) was a Luftwaffe ace and recipient of the Knight's Cross of the Iron Cross during World War II. The Knight's Cross of the Iron Cross was awarded to recognise extreme battlefield bravery or successful military leadership. Lindner joined the postwar German Air Force, at the time named the Bundesluftwaffe, in 1956 and retired in 1972 as an Oberstleutnant (colonel). During his career he was credited with 73 aerial victories, one on the Western Front and 72 on the Eastern Front, claimed in 650 combat missions.

Summary of career

Aerial victory claims
Lindner was credited with 73 victories, 72 of which on the Eastern Front and one on the Western Front, claimed in 650 combat mission. Mathews and Foreman, authors of Luftwaffe Aces — Biographies and Victory Claims, researched the German Federal Archives and found records for 72 aerial victory claims on the Eastern Front, plus one further unconfirmed claim on the Western Front.

Awards
 Aviator badge
 Front Flying Clasp of the Luftwaffe
 Iron Cross (1939)
 2nd Class
 1st Class
 German Cross in Gold on 27 May 1942 as Oberfeldwebel in the I./Jagdgeschwader 51
 Knight's Cross of the Iron Cross on 8 April 1944 as Leutnant and pilot in the Stabsstaffel/Jagdgeschwader 51 "Mölders"

Notes

References

Citations

Bibliography

External links

1917 births
1994 deaths
People from Amberg-Sulzbach
Luftwaffe pilots
German World War II flying aces
Recipients of the Gold German Cross
Recipients of the Knight's Cross of the Iron Cross
People from the Kingdom of Bavaria
German Air Force personnel
Military personnel from Bavaria